This is a list of 636 species in the genus Trypoxylon.

Trypoxylon species

References